Perigonia divisa is a moth of the  family Sphingidae. It is known from Cuba.

References

Perigonia
Moths of Cuba
Endemic fauna of Cuba
Moths described in 1865